Greenough Settlement is a mostly-residential neighbourhood in Dartmouth, Nova Scotia. It is located in the east end of Dartmouth in the Woodlawn area.

Communities in Halifax, Nova Scotia
Dartmouth, Nova Scotia